The Last Round-Up is a 1934 American Pre-Code Western film directed by Henry Hathaway and starring Randolph Scott, Monte Blue, and Barbara Fritchie.

Cast
 Randolph Scott as Jim Cleve
 Monte Blue as Jack Kells
 Barbara Fritchie as Joan Randall (*aka Barbara Adams as billed on film poster)
 Fred Kohler as Sam Gulden
 Fuzzy Knight as Charles Bunko McGee
 Sam Allen as First Miner

References

External links
 
 

1934 films
1934 Western (genre) films
Films based on works by Zane Grey
American Western (genre) films
Films directed by Henry Hathaway
American black-and-white films
1930s English-language films
1930s American films